Christopher Skeete is a Canadian politician who was elected to the National Assembly of Quebec in the 2018 provincial election. He represents the electoral district of Sainte-Rose as a member of the Coalition Avenir Québec. On October 18, 2018 he was named parliamentary secretary to the premier François Legault. He was named the Parliamentary Assistant to the Premier for Relations with English-Speaking Quebecers on November 7, 2018. On February 24, 2021 he was appointed Parliamentary Assistant to the Minister Responsible for the Fight Against Racism. Prior to achieving elected office in 2018, Skeete was Vice-President for the West-du-Québec region of the Coalition Avenir Québec party.

Skeete was born on September 20, 1979 in Laval, Quebec. He attended Vanier college. He holds a Masters of Business Administration (MBA) from the ESG-UQÀM in Montréal as well as a Bachelor’s degree in political science and public affairs from Concordia University. Even though he attended English Cegep, he supported Bill 96, which has been deemed discriminatory by the anglophone community.

Earlier in his career, Skeete worked as a customs officer and also as the director of regional operations for a veterinary clinic. With his wife, he started CasMedic, a firm that provides mobile blood tests to patients in their homes as well as vaccinations to clients at pharmacies.

He was previously a candidate for the party in the district of Vimont in the 2012 election, and in the district of Fabre in the 2014 election.

Electoral record

|}

|}

References

1979 births
Living people
Coalition Avenir Québec MNAs
Politicians from Laval, Quebec
Black Canadian politicians
Canadian people of Trinidad and Tobago descent
21st-century Canadian politicians